Don Pedro is a tragic play by the British writer Richard Cumberland. It was first staged at the Haymarket Theatre in July 1796.

References

Bibliography
 Mudford, William. The Life of Richard Cumberland. Sherwood, Neely & Jones, 1812.
 Nicoll, Allardyce. A History of English Drama 1660-1900. Volume III: Late Eighteenth Century Drama. Cambridge University Press, 1952.
 Watson, George. The New Cambridge Bibliography of English Literature: Volume 2, 1660-1800. Cambridge University Press, 1971.

Plays by Richard Cumberland
1796 plays
West End plays
Tragedy plays